Thompsonville is a census-designated place (CDP) and unincorporated community in Jim Hogg County, Texas, United States. The population of the CDP was 46 at the 2010 census.

According to the Handbook of Texas, the community was probably named after Jim Hogg County's first sheriff, Oscar Thompson.

Thompsonville's history dates back to the 1910s. The first commercial oil well in the county began producing oil on April 17, 1921. The well was located in the Mirando Valley field near Thompsonville and brought new residents to the area. A post office in 1925, but was discontinued around 1936. A school and several businesses were located at the site in the late 1940s. Today, Thompsonville is a small, dispersed community with a population less than 50.

References

External links
 

Unincorporated communities in Jim Hogg County, Texas
Unincorporated communities in Texas
Census-designated places in Jim Hogg County, Texas
Census-designated places in Texas